Battle of Rügen may refer to:

 Battle of Rügen (1565)
 Battle of Rügen (1715)
 Battle of Rügen (1864)

See also
 Operation Rügen, code name for the 1937 bombing of Guernica during the Spanish Civil War
 Wars of the Rügen Succession (14th century)
 Ruegen (disambiguation)